Ray Willis (born August 13, 1982) is a former American football offensive tackle who last played for the Kansas City Chiefs of the National Football League (NFL). He was selected by the Seattle Seahawks in the 4th round (105th overall pick) of the 2005 NFL Draft. He played college football for the Florida State University Seminoles.

He has also been a member of the Miami Dolphins, New Orleans Saints and New York Jets.

Early years
Willis attended Angleton High School and was a letterman in football. In football, as a senior, he was an All-District honoree, a Class 5A All-State honoree, and after his senior season, he was named an All-Midland Regional honorable mention by Prep Star, and was ranked the Super Prep's 28th best offensive lineman, and the 36th-best football prospect in the state of Texas.

College career
Willis attended Florida State University, where he started 35 games and teamed with Alex Barron to make one of the best offensive lines in college football.

Professional career

Seattle Seahawks
He started at both right guard and right tackle for Seattle. He is known as a good run blocker. He re-signed with the team on March 6, 2008 and then again on March 9, 2009.

Miami Dolphins
On August 5, 2011, Willis signed with the Miami Dolphins. Willis's contract was terminated by the Dolphins on September 3.

New Orleans Saints
Willis signed with the New Orleans Saints on November 2, 2011.

New York Jets
Willis was signed by the New York Jets on May 29, 2012. He was waived by the team on June 28.

Kansas City Chiefs
Willis was signed by the Kansas City Chiefs on July 31, 2012. He looks to compete for the offensive swing-tackle position.

Personal life
Ray Willis is married to the former Kimberly Pettaway of Tarboro, North Carolina. His wife gave birth to twins - a boy and a girl - on February 23, 2008.

References

External links
Kansas City Chiefs bio
Miami Dolphins bio
Seattle Seahawks bio

1982 births
Living people
People from Angleton, Texas
Angleton High School alumni
Players of American football from Texas
American football offensive tackles
Florida State Seminoles football players
Seattle Seahawks players
Sportspeople from the Houston metropolitan area
Miami Dolphins players
New Orleans Saints players
New York Jets players
Kansas City Chiefs players